Cancer Management and Research is a peer-reviewed medical journal covering research on cancer. It is published by Dove Medical Press.

External links 
 

English-language journals
Open access journals
Dove Medical Press academic journals
Oncology journals
Publications established in 2009